The 1984 Puerto Rican general elections were held in Puerto Rico on 6 November 1984. Rafael Hernández Colón of the Popular Democratic Party (PPD) was elected Governor, whilst the PPD also won a majority of seats in the House of Representatives and the Senate. Voter turnout was 88.9%.

Results

Governor

Resident Commissioner

House of Representatives

Senate

References

1984 elections in the Caribbean
1984
Elections
Puerto Rico